The 2022 Maharashtra political crisis began on 21 June 2022 in the Indian state of Maharashtra when Eknath Shinde,  along with several other MLAs of the Maha Vikas Aghadi (MVA) coalition moved to Surat in the Bharatiya Janata Party (BJP)-governed Gujarat, throwing the coalition into a crisis. The group later moved to Guwahati in another BJP-governed state, Assam. Shiv Sena leader Sanjay Raut accused BJP of causing the revolt within Shiv Sena and attempting to topple the MVA-coalition government, implicitly mentioned later in a remark by BJP's  Sushil Modi. Eknath Shinde led a revolt against Uddhav Thackeray because he disagreed with Thackeray's decision not to end the alliance with Maha Vikas Aaghadi, despite requests from two-thirds of elected Shiv Sena members. Shinde's faction ultimately succeeded in taking control of the party and forming a new government in Maharashtra with the support of the BJP. On 29 June, Uddhav Thackeray, Chief Minister of Maharashtra, resigned from the post as well as a MLC member while speaking live on social media ahead of a no-confidence motion on 29 June 2022. The resignation of Thackeray saw the cancellation of the floor test, with Shinde taking stake of the government as the Chief Minister and Devendra Fadnavis as the Deputy Chief Minister on 30 June.

Background

In the 2019 Maharashtra Legislative Assembly elections, Bharatiya Janata Party (BJP) and Shiv Sena (SHS) contested the election jointly under the alliance Mahayuti. Indian National Congress (INC) and Nationalist Congress Party (NCP) fought under the alliance Maha Aghadi.

BJP won 105 seats, Shiv Sena won 56 seats, NCP won 54 seats and INC won 44 seats. After the declaration of results of the Maharashtra elections, differences arose between Shiv Sena and BJP on the power-sharing arrangement. 
Shiv Sena demanded an equal share in power which was allegedly agreed upon by the BJP, (which BJP leaders including Amit Shah had denied publicly). Shiv Sena demanded the post of Chief Minister for 2.5 years according to alleged 50-50 agreement.  The incumbent CM from BJP, Devendra Fadnavis denied any such formula had been agreed upon. BJP eventually ended breaking ties with one of their oldest ally Shiv Sena. Shiv Sena then declined to support the BJP to form the government. The 2019 Maharashtra political crisis ensued.

Eventually Shiv Sena joined the Maha Aghadi alliance of INC and NCP to form the Maha Vikas Aghadi (MVA) alliance with a combined seat count of 154 seats where  145 seats were needed for majority. The MVA alliance decided to form the government under the leadership of Uddhav Thackeray as the Chief minister.

Eknath Shinde was in favor of breaking the Maha Vikas Aghadi and reestablishing BJP-Shiv Sena coalition. He requested Uddhav Thackeray to break the alliance and his request was ignored on multiple occasions. He gathered 2/3rd members from his party to support his request and 2022 Maharashtra political crisis started.

Cross voting in Rajya Sabha and Legislative Council elections 
On 10 June 2022, the infighting in the party got highlighted for the first time when BJP won 3 out of 6 seats in the Rajya Sabha elections. On 20 June 2022, out of 10 seats going for Maharashtra Legislative Council elections, Shiv Sena and its allies were expected to win 6 seats, however they only won 5. BJP won the other 5 seats reportedly due to cross voting by several Shiv Sena members.

Crisis

Initial Breakout
Immediately after the Legislative council election results, Eknath Shinde, a senior Shiv Sena leader, disappeared and could not be contacted. On 21 June 2022, a meeting was called by Uddhav Thackeray with all his MLAs but 10-12 MLAs were also found unreachable. 11 MLAs of the Shiv Sena, led by Shinde, flew to Surat city, in the BJP governed state of Gujarat. Shinde was removed from the post of the Shiv Sena party whip. Shinde removed the word Shiv Sena from his Twitter profile. In his hotel in Surat he had several meetings with the BJP leaders.

To prevent further loss of MLAs, Shiv Sena housed the rest of its MLAs in several hotels in Mumbai. Soon Shinde claimed that he commanded the support of "nearly 40 MLAs". Shinde required support of 37 MLAs (two-thirds of the total strength of 55) to avoid being disqualified under the Anti-defection laws in India. Shinde demanded Thackeray break the Maha Vikas Aghadi and re-join the alliance with the BJP.

Stay at Guwahati
On 22 June, Shinde said that he had moved 40 legislators to Guwahati, Assam. Several INC and NCP leaders criticized Himanta Biswa Sarma, CM of Assam, for interfering in Maharashtra politics instead of focusing on the massive flood in Assam. Sarma denied the knowledge of Shinde and his stay with the other rebel MLAs in Guwahati.

After failing to convince Shinde to return to Mumbai, on 22 June, Uddhav Thackeray, Chief Minister of Maharashtra, declared that he was ready to step down as the leader of the alliance and as Chief Minister. Later that day, Uddhav Thackeray moved from the residence of the CM Varsha to his private residence, Matoshree.

Senior Shiv Sena leader Sanjay Raut accused the BJP of causing the revolt within Shiv Sena and attempting to topple the MVA coalition government. Shiv Sena MLA Udaysingh Rajput said that he was offered  in cash to join the rebel group but he declined.

On 23 June, Shinde and 37 MLAs declared Shinde leader of the Shiv Sena legislature party. On 24 June, Shiv Sena filed a petition against the rebel MLAs and demanded the Deputy speaker Narahari Zirwal of Maharashtra Assembly to disqualify 16 MLAs of the Shinde camp. Zirwal met with Shiv Sena leaders and later also met with Advocate-General of Maharashtra for legal opinion. Both Thackeray and Shinde camp leaders were asked to present their arguments about the disqualification. A No-confidence motion against Zirwal was brought by two independent MLAs supporting BJP. This no-confidence vote signed by 34 MLAs was rejected by Zirwal reportedly because the petition was send through an anonymous e-mail and not submitted by an MLA himself.

On the same day, Eknath Shinde, Home minister Amit Shah and former chief minister Devendra Fadnavis met in Vadodara, Gujarat reportedly to plan a merger or coalition to topple the MVA government. The office of a rebel Shiv Sena leader was allegedly vandalized by members of the Shiv Sena.

On 26 June, Eknath Shinde moved to the Supreme Court of India to dispute the rejection of the no-confidence vote against the Deputy speaker, and challenge the disqualification plea against 16 of them. According to Shiv Sena at least 20 MLAs in Shinde's camp were communicating with Chief Minister Uddhav Thackeray. Some of them did not support merging the breakaway group with the BJP.

On 27 June, during the hearing in the Supreme Court of India, the court directed the Deputy speaker to postpone the next hearing to July 11 to give time to the rebel MLAs. It also asked Deputy Speaker Zirwal to file a detailed affidavit about the no-confidence motion against him. During the hearing, when asked about the rebels approach to the Bombay High Court, the rebel counsel responded that “Threats to us and our families make it non-conducive to pursue cases in Mumbai."

Resignation of Uddhav Thackeray
On 28 June, Devendra Fadnavis met Maharashtra Governor Bhagat Singh Koshyari and demanded a motion of no confidence against Uddhav Thackeray. On 29 June, Koshiyari ordered a trust vote motion to be held and the assembly strength of the government be proven by 30 June. Shiv Sena immediately moved to the Supreme court against this order. On the same day, the supreme court refused to stay the no-confidence motion and ordered it to be conducted the next day on 30 June stating that “The floor of the House is the only way to settle all issues.”. A few hours later, Uddhav Thackeray resigned from the post of Chief Minister of Maharashtra and said that he will also resign from the Maharashtra Legislative Council after the supreme court decision while addressing on social media.

On 17 February 2023, the Electoral Commission allotted the name Shiv Sena and the party symbol of bow and arrow to Eknath Shinde's faction. This officially concluded the political crisis and officially defined Eknath Shinde as the sole leader of Shiv Sena.

Formation of new government 

On 30 June, Shinde and Fadnavis staked the claim to form the government and declared Eknath Shinde Chief Minister of Maharashtra. Fadnavis at the press conference declared that the majority party, BJP, would sit out and support the government under Shinde but would not be part of the government. This led to reactions, with the BJP President JP Nadda requesting him to take charge as the Deputy Chief Minister of the state and become part of the government. Later that day Eknath Shinde and Devendra Fadnavis took oath as the Chief Minister and next Deputy Chief Minister of Maharashtra respectively.

Composition 

Members of Maharashtra Legislative Assembly by their political party:

See also
 Uddhav Thackeray ministry

References

2022 in Indian politics
Political crises in India
June 2022 events in India